The Columbus Ironworks (also known as the Columbus Georgia Convention & Trade Center) was built in 1853. It was listed on the U.S. National Register of Historic Places in 1969. During the Civil War, the industrial plant produced weapons for the Confederate army. These weapons included cannons, pistols, rifles, and swords.

Today, it is used as an event center. Recurring events include local high school dances or dinners, Christmas in the South (a three-day Christmas sale), NerdaCon and concerts. In addition to hosting events, the center displays artifacts and factoids from its days as a factory.

References

External links

Buildings and structures in Columbus, Georgia
Historic American Engineering Record in Georgia (U.S. state)
Industrial buildings and structures on the National Register of Historic Places in Georgia (U.S. state)
National Register of Historic Places in Muscogee County, Georgia